Sauvé was a former provincial electoral district in the Canadian province of Quebec.

It included part of the city and later borough of Montréal-Nord.

It was created for the 1973 election from part of Bourassa electoral district. Its final election was in 1998.  In the 2003 election, part of Bourassa and all of Sauvé were combined again to create Bourassa-Sauvé.

It was named after former Quebec Premier Paul Sauvé, who led the province for 100 days in 1959 after the death of Maurice Duplessis, until his own death.

Members of the National Assembly

References

External links
Election results
 Election results (National Assembly)
 Election results (QuebecPolitique.com)
Maps
1992–2001 changes (Flash)

Former provincial electoral districts of Quebec
Montréal-Nord